Green Chemistry is a monthly peer-reviewed scientific journal covering every aspect of sustainable chemistry and its implementation in chemical engineering. It is published by the Royal Society of Chemistry and was established in 1999 by James Clark (University of York). Articles published in this journal are intended to be conceptually accessible to a wide audience. The editors-in-chief is Javier Pérez-Ramírez.

Article types
 Research papers (which contain original scientific work that has not been published previously)
 Communications (original scientific work that is of an urgent nature and that has not been published previously)
 Green Chemistry news (an easy-to-read magazine style section)

Abstracting, indexing, and impact factor 
According to the Journal Citation Reports, the journal has a 2020 impact factor of 10.182.

It is indexed in the following bibliographic databases:
Scopus
Web of Science

See also
List of chemistry journals

References

External links

Chemistry journals
Royal Society of Chemistry academic journals
Publications established in 1999
English-language journals
Monthly journals